Limacia janssi is a sea slug, a species of dorid nudibranch. It is a marine gastropod mollusc in the family Polyceridae.

Distribution
Limacia janssi was described from Bahia Santa Elena, Guanacaste, Costa Rica. Additional specimens from Isla Partida, Gulf of California, Mexico were included in the original description. It has also been reported from Isla San Pedro Mártir, Gulf of California.

References

Polyceridae
Gastropods described in 1974